Harding's Gallery in Boston, Massachusetts, exhibited works by European and American artists in the 1830s-1840s. The building on School Street also housed a newspaper press; the Mercantile Library Association; the Boston Artists' Association; and artists' studios. The building's name derived from painter Chester Harding, who kept his studio there.

History

Jefferson auction 

In July 1833, an auction occurred at the gallery of some of the paintings bought by Thomas Jefferson in Paris, and subsequently hung about his house at Monticello. Original works for sale included a portrait of George Washington by Joseph Wright/John Trumbull (1784); a portrait of John Adams by Mather Brown (1788); and a portrait of Lafayette by Joseph Boze (1790).  The auction also offered copies of works by Domenichino; Holbein; Godfrey Kneller (portrait of John Locke); Leonardo; Le Sueur; Raphael; Ribera; Rubens; Van Dyck; and others. Some of the copies depicted originals in the Palazzo Pitti and elsewhere.

Jefferson's paintings of Natural Bridge and The Potomac Coming Through the Blue Ridge by William Roberts were sold at the Harding auction.  The original purchase of these two paintings is recorded in Jefferson's ledger.  A copy of the auction catalog for Jefferson's first auction in 1828 is held by the New York Public Library.  A copy of the catalog for the Harding auction in 1833 is held by the Alderman Library at the University of Virginia.

Buyers at the Harding auction included James W. Sever; Israel Thorndike, Jr.; and Mrs. John W. Davis.

Exhibitions

Washington Allston 

"In 1839 there was an exhibition ... of such works of Washington Allston as could be borrowed for the occasion. This was managed by the friends of the artist for his benefit. The exhibition was held in Harding's Gallery, a square, well-lighted room, but too small for the larger pictures. It was, however, the best room that could be procured for the purpose. Here was shown forty-five pictures, including one or two drawings. ... On entering, the presence of the artist seemed to fill the room. The door-keeper held the door, but Allston held the room." Works included: "Dead man restored to life" (1813); "The Valentine;" "Isaac of York;" "Portrait of Benjamin West, late president of the Royal Academy, London;" "Portrait of Samuel Williams;" "Rosalie;" "Jessica and Lorenzo;" "Portrait of the late Mrs. Wm. Channing;" and others. Lenders to the exhibit included David Sears; James F. Baldwin; George Ticknor; Warren Dutton; Nathan Appleton; Thomas Handasyd Perkins; Thomas H. Perkins Jr.; William H. Sumner; and others.

Boston Artists Association 

The first public exhibit of the newly formed Boston Artists' Association in 1842 at Harding's Gallery featured works by mostly local artists, as well as a few by (or after) European masters (e.g. Tintoretto, Rembrandt). Visitors to the gallery could see recent pieces by Fitz Henry Lane and Gilbert Stuart. T.H. Perkins and others lent works to the exhibition. The second and third exhibits of the association took place 1843–1844. Margaret Fuller, on visiting Harding's on July 6, 1844, wrote in her diary: "I went to town. Artists' Gallery, sad sad sight."

Events 
 1833, July 19 – Auction of paintings from the collection of Thomas Jefferson.
 1834, May – Artist's exhibit. Included works by Francis Alexander; Thomas Doughty; Alvan Fisher; Chester Harding, Charles Hubbard.
 1834 – Marble statuary exhibit. Included works by (or after) Baelandi; Barratta;  Bartolini;  Bellucci;  Benassae;  Bombardi;  Canova;  Cardelli;  Fidia;  Orzalezi;  Pampaloni;  Tenerani;  Thorwaldsen;  Vanelli.
 1839 – Washington Allston exhibit.
 1841 – Armour and arms exhibit, from the Royal Armoury of Segovia; along with paintings. Included works by (or after) Francisco Zurbarán; Clarkson Frederick Stanfield; Edwin Henry Landseer;  Henritz Koekoeck;  Robert Bridgehouse;  Luca Giordano;  Cornelis de Heem;  J.C. Clayton;  Caspar Netscher.
 1841 – Modern European painting exhibit.
 1842 – 1st Boston Artists' Association exhibit. Included: Henry Sargent;  Fitz Henry Lane;  Tintoretto; Anthony van Dyck;  and others.
 1843 – 2nd Boston Artists' Association exhibit. Included: Thomas Cole;  Philip Harry; Asher Brown Durand;  Thomas Sully;  and others.
 1844 – 3rd Boston Artists' Association exhibit
 1846 – Master paintings exhibit, from Italy; charity benefit. Included works for sale by (or copies after): Paul Bril; Giuseppe Cesari; Domenico Fiasella; Abraham Janssens; Salvator Rosa; Carlo Antonio Tavella; Paolo Veronese; Giovanni Battista Zelotti.

Image gallery

References

Further reading

Publications of the gallery 
 Catalogue of valuable oil paintings, many of them old masters, and all choice pictures: being the collection of the late President Jefferson : to be sold at auction, on Friday, July 19, at Mr. Harding's Gallery, School St.: sale to commence at 10 o'clock. J.L. Cunningham, auctioneer. Boston: J.E. Hinckley, 1833.
 Catalogue of paintings at the artist's exhibition, in Harding's Gallery, Boston, May, 1834. Boston: J.H. Eastburn, 1834.
 Catalogue of marble statuary now exhibited at Harding's Rooms. Boston: W.W. Clapp, 1834.
 Exhibition of pictures painted by Washington Allston. Boston: John H. Eastburn, Printer, 1839.
 Catalogue of a collection of ancient armour and arms, chiefly of the period of Charles V, from the Royal Armoury of Segovia: also, of a choice collection of pictures now exhibiting at Harding's Gallery, School Street. Boston: John H. Eastburn, printer, 1841.
 A Catalogue of nearly 200 splendid modern European paintings: by the most distinguished European living artists, now exhibiting at Harding's Gallery ... Will be sold ... at public auction, on ... May 25th. J.L. Cunningham, auctioneer. Boston: Marden, 1841.
 The constitution of the Boston Artists' Association, with a catalogue of the first public exhibition of paintings at Harding's Gallery, no. 22 School Street. Boston: John H. Eastburn, printer, 1842.
 Catalogue of paintings of the second exhibition of the Boston Artists' Association, 1843. Boston: Wm. White & H.P. Lewis, 1843.
 Catalogue of paintings, of the third exhibition of the Boston Artists' Association, 1844. Boston: Clapp and Son's Press, 1844.
 Catalogue of paintings by some of the first masters: lately received from Italy, and now exhibiting for the benefit of the poor of this city, at Harding's Gallery. 1846.

Publications about the gallery 
 Margaret Fuller. "Record of Impressions." The Dial, v.1, no.1, July 1840; p.73+  Review of the 1839 Allston exhibit.
 Review: Exhibition of Pictures painted by Washington Allston at Harding's Gallery, School Street. North American Review, Vol. 50, No. 107 (Apr., 1840), pp. 358-381.
 Boston Evening Transcript, June 1, 1842.
 Daily National Intelligencer, November 22, 1842.
 The Fine Arts. Exhibition of Harding's Gallery. Boston Daily Courier, September 18, 1843.
 The Pictures at Harding's Gallery. Boston Evening Transcript. November 22, 1845.
 The Exhibition at Harding's Gallery. Boston Evening Transcript, November 24, 1845.
 The Paintings at Harding's Gallery. Boston Evening Transcript, December 6, 1845.
 Boston Evening Transcript. July 20, 1846.

See also 
 Boston Artists' Association, in Harding's Gallery c. 1841–1846
 Chester Harding
 Mercantile Library Association (Boston, Massachusetts), in Harding's buildings 1836–1841

External links 

 Smithsonian American Art Museum. Pre-1877 Art Exhibition Catalogue Index. Includes details of individual artworks exhibited at the gallery.
 Thomas Jefferson Foundation. Thomas Jefferson Encyclopedia. Includes images and details of works auctioned at the gallery in 1833.

19th century in Boston
Cultural history of Boston
Defunct art museums and galleries in Boston
Financial District, Boston
1833 establishments in Massachusetts
1840s disestablishments in Massachusetts
1830s in the United States
1840s in the United States